The 1935 Calgary municipal election was held on November 20, 1935, to elect a Mayor and six Aldermen to sit on Calgary City Council. Along with positions on Calgary City Council, three trustees for the Public School Board, and three trustees for the Separate School Board were elected. Nominations closed on November 4, 1935.

Calgary City Council governed under "Initiative, Referendum and Recall" which is composed of a Mayor, Commissioner and twelve Aldermen all elected to staggered two year terms. Mayor Andrew Davison and six Aldermen: Douglas Cunnington, Frank Roy Freeze, William Ayer Lincoln, Robert Henry Parkyn, and Aylmer John Eggert Liesemer elected in 1934 continued in their positions.

Background
The election was held under the Single Transferable Voting/Proportional Representation (STV/PR) with the term for candidates being two years.

W. R. Herbert contested the Mayor's seat for the Social Credit Party, which successfully swept the Legislative Assembly months earlier in the 1935 Alberta general election. Social Credit Premier William Aberhart had previously stated that he did not favour the Social Credit party entering municipal politics. During the campaign it came to light that Herbert's business "Herbert Pain and Varnish Co., Ltd." was in three years in arrears for business tax and water service, however, Herbert was not disqualified.

Alderman Fred J. White resigned halfway through his two-year term to content the Mayor's seat.

Results
Results from Calgary Daily Herald.

Mayor

Least popular candidates were eliminated, their votes transferred, and Davison eventually accumulated a majority of votes to win the seat.

Council
Quota for election was 3,313.

Public School Board
The quota was 3,053

Separate school board

See also
List of Calgary municipal elections

References

1930s in Calgary
Municipal elections in Calgary
1935 elections in Canada